Arcobara (previously identified as Arcobadara (Arkobadara) ) was a Dacian town mentioned by Ptolemy.

See also 
 Arcobara (castra)
 Dacian davae
 List of ancient cities in Thrace and Dacia
 Dacia
 Roman Dacia

References

Ancient

Modern

Further reading 

 

Dacian towns
Ancient history of Transylvania